Washougal is a city in Clark County, Washington, United States. The population was 17,039 as of the 2020 census.

History

Washougal was officially incorporated on December 4, 1908. Its Mount Pleasant Grange Hall is the oldest continually used grange hall in Washington.

This small community is located on the Washington side of the Columbia River, with its lowlands and famous prairie situated on the west entrance to the scenic Columbia River Gorge. Motorists who approach Washougal from the west on the Lewis & Clark Highway can see Mount Hood rising above the Cascade Mountains framed by the columnar cliffs that signal the gateway of the Gorge.  It is home to Excelsior High School and Washougal High School.

It can be accurately stated that Washougal is the "crossroads to discovery" in the Pacific Northwest. Shortly after Capt. Robert Gray, a Boston fur trader, entered the mouth of the Columbia River in May 1792, the famed British explorer George Vancouver traveled to the region to verify Gray's discovery. In October 1792, Vancouver directed a young Lieutenant named William Broughton to lead a party of men in a long boat up the Columbia to explore its head waters. Broughton came as far as present-day Washougal and landed near the east end of Reed Island. He named Mount Hood after a British admiral and Point Vancouver after his commanding officer. Broughton incorrectly assumed the head waters of the Columbia originated from Mount Hood.

Captain Gray's discovery of the Columbia opened trade between Europeans and Chinook Indians who lived along the lower Columbia between the Cascade region and the river's mouth. U.S., British, Spanish and Russian fur traders bartered for sea otter and beaver skins in the late 18th century. Then, another important group of explorers visited the region in 1805–1806, but this group came from the east, which marked the first cross-continental expedition. These famed explorers were Meriwether Lewis & William Clark.

The Corps of Discovery was impressed with the fertile valley located near Washougal. In fact, when they finally reached the Pacific Coast and conducted their historic vote on selecting their winter camp site, the three viable options considered were the Clatsop area near Astoria (Oregon), the north bank near Chinook (Washington), and the fertile valley near the Sandy and Washougal Rivers. But, because the Corps had reached the Pacific in late November, they did not have much time to construct a winter fort before the cold weather set in, therefore choosing the Clatsop region because of the abundance of big game and its view of the Pacific—and they hoped to make contact with a fur trading ship to get word back to President Jefferson about the success of their mission.

On their return to the east, the Corps of Discovery rowed hard against the current hoping to return to the Nez Perce in early spring. The Nez Perce were caring for their horses over the winter and they needed the horses to travel over the Rocky Mountains. They arrived at Washougal on Monday, March 31, 1806. Lewis wrote in his journals that they camped on the lower end of a handsome prairie two miles up from the mouth of Seal (Washougal) River and directly across from the upper Quicksand (Sandy) River channel. By triangulating these landmarks, it places their campsite close to present day Capt. William Clark Park at Cottonwood Beach. The Corps would eventually camp at this location for six days in order to kill big game, dry the meat, and sew leather sacks in which to store the meat. Natives descending the river told them of scarcity in provisions (food sources) east of the Cascades. So the handsome prairie in present-day Washougal turned into a provisioning camp which became their second longest campsite in present-day Washington State.

So within a 13-year period Washougal would have famous travelers visit its banks from both the east and west—again in 1811 another famed explorer (David Thompson) would camp near the same "handsome prairie" on his famous journey to chart the entire length of the Columbia River.

In 1825, the Hudson's Bay Fur Company established Fort Vancouver near present-day Vancouver, Washington. Fur trappers and loggers began to visit regions of the Columbia River and they also assigned names to familiar locations. Washougal became known as Washougally Camp, which is thought to be a derivative of a Native American word meaning "rushing water." One of the first Europeans to settle in this area was a British seaman named Richard Ough (also spelled Howe) who arrived in 1838. While working at Ft. Vancouver, he met and fell in love with Betsy White Wing, a Native American Princess of the Cascades people. Her father, Chief Slyhorse Schluyhus, agreed to their marriage as a political alliance, but he stipulated as a condition that Richard must settle down. After their marriage in 1838, they stayed at Ft. Vancouver. Then in the 1840s, Richard bought a large swath of land near current downtown Washougal. He purchased it from a fellow settler for $45, a horse, a saddle, and a few loaves of bread.

Washougal was founded on part of the Oughs' original claim. Among Washougal's first and foremost citizens, the Oughs were generous with food and money. The Oughs had ten children in all, Sarah, Grace, Richard, Benjamin, Elizabeth, Mary, Fredrick, Cecelia, Emma, and John Thomas. Both Richard and Betsy Ough lived long and fulfilling lives, eventually owning a dairy dying at the ages 90 and 96, respectively. Both are buried in the local Catholic Cemetery and they have descendants who still live in Washougal. Personal belongings of the Ough's—including clothing and Native American artifacts—can be found in the Two Rivers Heritage Museum in Washougal.

Just downstream from the handsome prairie where Lewis & Clark and David Thompson camped there was a natural boat landing that later became known as Parker's Landing and played an important role for settlers following the Oregon Trail. Many pioneers coming out west would arrive at the Dalles (Oregon), where they would make rafts to float down the Columbia River. Dr. John McLoughlin, the chief factor of the Hudson's Bay Fur Company at Ft. Vancouver, tried to dissuade American pioneers from settling on the north side of the Columbia River. He sent men to build barges and rafts to float pioneers to Ft. Vancouver, where they received food and clothing and were encouraged to settle in the Willamette Valley (Oregon). Those who did not want to settle in Oregon would float rafts to Parker's Landing, where a natural eddy would wash their barges and rafts up against the north bank. By arriving at Parker's Landing, they could travel to the interior of what would become Washington State, avoiding the British at Fort Vancouver who would try to persuade them to settle elsewhere. A well-known free African-American named George Washington Bush entered the state of Washington through Parker's Landing, and eventually traveled to the center of the state, where he founded the community of Tumwater. David C. Parker came out on a wagon train with Bush and both floated down the Columbia on rafts in 1845. In 1846, when the Oregon Territory land dispute was resolved between England and the United States and the northern boundary was moved to the 49th parallel, Parker was quick to file for a land grant, which included the popular beach landing that would later assume his name and become the marina for the Port of Camas-Washougal. In fact, Parker would apply to have a young, fledgling community incorporated in 1852, and the community would be called Parkersville. This is thought to be the oldest incorporated community in the state of Washington. But a new community was developed just one mile upriver from Parkersville, closer to the lowlands for dairy farming and logging. It is this community that eventually became Washougal.

Geography

Washougal is in the Columbia River Gorge along the Washougal River, which runs through town.

Climate
This region experiences warm (but not hot) and dry summers, with no average monthly temperatures above .  According to the Köppen Climate Classification system, Washougal has a warm-summer Mediterranean climate, abbreviated "Csb" on climate maps.

Recreation
Washougal is home to several recreational areas and public parks. Of these, Angelo Park, Beaver Park, Campen Creek Park, and Hathaway Park are four large municipal parks located in Washougal.

Demographics

2010 census
As of the census of 2010, there were 14,095 people, 5,256 households, and 3,824 families residing in the city. The racial makeup of the city was 90.3% White, 0.6% African American, 1.0% Native American, 2.4% Asian, 0.2% Pacific Islander, 1.7% from other races, and 3.8% from two or more races. Hispanic or Latino of any race were 14.3% of the population.

There were 5,256 households, of which 38.0% had children under the age of 18 living with them, 55.3% were married couples living together, 12.0% had a female householder with no husband present, 5.4% had a male householder with no wife present, and 27.2% were non-families. 20.6% of all households were made up of individuals, and 7% had someone living alone who was 65 years of age or older. The average household size was 2.68 and the average family size was 3.07.

The median age in the city was 36.1 years. 26.9% of residents were under the age of 18; 7.7% were between the ages of 18 and 24; 28.1% were from 25 to 44; 27.1% were from 45 to 64; and 10.1% were 65 years of age or older. The gender makeup of the city was 49.7% male and 50.3% female.

2000 census
As of the census of 2000, there were 8,595 people, 3,294 households, and 2,325 families residing in the city. The population density was 1,734.5 people per square mile (669.1/km2). There were 3,463 housing units at an average density of 698.8 per square mile (269.6/km2). The racial makeup of the city was 94.0% White, 0.4% African American, 1.26% Native American, 0.78% Asian, 0.12% Pacific Islander, 0.83% from other races, and 2.56% from two or more races. Hispanic or Latino of any race were 2.51% of the population. 16.0% were of German, 10.7% English, 8.5% American, 7.4% Irish, 5.5% European and 5.1% Norwegian ancestry. 95.8% spoke English and 2.5% Spanish as their first language.

There were 3,294 households, out of which 37.9% had children under the age of 18 living with them, 51.3% were married couples living together, 14.1% had a female householder with no husband present, and 29.4% were non-families. 23.6% of all households were made up of individuals, and 8.3% had someone living alone who was 65 years of age or older. The average household size was 2.61 and the average family size was 3.05.

In the city, the age distribution of the population shows 29.8% under the age of 18, 8.3% from 18 to 24, 30.1% from 25 to 44, 20.6% from 45 to 64, and 11.2% who were 65 years of age or older. The median age was 34 years. For every 100 females, there were 96.3 males. For every 100 females age 18 and over, there were 91.7 males.

The median income for a household in the city was $38,719, and the median income for a family was $52,293. Males had a median income of $37,351 versus $26,032 for females. The per capita income for the city was $19,389. About 8.3% of families and 9.7% of the population were below the poverty line, including 13.8% of those under age 18 and 3.6% of those age 65 or over.

References

External links
 History of Washougal at HistoryLink
 City school district
 Official city website

 
Cities in Clark County, Washington
Cities in Washington (state)
Columbia River Gorge
Populated places established in 1852
Portland metropolitan area
Washington (state) populated places on the Columbia River
1852 establishments in Oregon Territory